Mobi Okoli (born 4 February 1987) is a Nigerian footballer playing for Bryne. He has previously played for Sandnes Ulf, and played two matches in Tippeligaen in 2012, the highest division in the Norwegian football league system.

He joined Sandnes Ulf in 2010. He made his debut in Tippeligaen on 28 April 2012, in the match against Fredrikstad, when he replaced Anel Raskaj in the 83rd minute.

Okoli joined Bryne on 31 August 2012.

Career statistics

References

1987 births
Living people
Nigerian footballers
Association football midfielders
Sandnes Ulf players
Bryne FK players
Norwegian First Division players
Eliteserien players
Nigerian expatriate footballers
Expatriate footballers in Norway
Nigerian expatriate sportspeople in Norway